Manikantana Mahime is a 1993 Indian Kannada-language film,  directed by K. Shankar and produced by V. Swaminathan. The film stars Vishnuvardhan, Sarath Babu, Srikanth and Srinivasa Murthy. The film has musical score by M. S. Viswanathan. The film was dubbed into Tamil as Varuvaan Manikandan.

Cast

Vishnuvardhan
Sarath Babu
Srikanth
Srinivasa Murthy
Srinath
M. N. Nambiar
Shivaram
Seetharam
M. D. Kaushik
Jayapradha
Tara
Pandari Bai
Mynavathi
B. V. Radha
Vaishali Kasaravalli
M. S. Karanth
Bharath Bhagavathar

References

External links
 
 

1993 films
1990s Kannada-language films
Films scored by M. S. Viswanathan
Films directed by K. Shankar